The Plaxton Beaver, originally known as the Reeve Burgess Beaver, is a minibus body built by Plaxton. It was built at the Pilsley, Derbyshire factory of Plaxton's Reeve Burgess subsidiary from 1987 to 1991, at Plaxton's main Scarborough factory from 1991, and from 1995 at Anston in South Yorkshire.

The Beaver has been built mainly on Mercedes-Benz van-derived minibus chassis such as the 709D and 811D, and was also built on the Renault S56 and S75 until 1992. Rare examples were also built on Iveco 49.10 chassis.

The Beaver 2, built on Mercedes-Benz Vario chassis, replaced the original Beaver in December 1996, and was still in production in 2007. In 2006 Plaxton launched the Beaver 3, the Beaver 2 body combined with the front end of a Plaxton Cheetah.

Gallery

See also 

 List of buses

References
 Millar, Alan (1992) Bus & Coach Recognition : Ian Allan Ltd., 
 Millar, Alan (2007) Bus & Coach Recognition : Ian Allan Ltd., 
 Plaxton History & Heritage at Plaxton Centenary website

External links

 The Beaver's product page at Plaxton's website
 Plaxton Beaver - wheelchair accessible transport in daily use around Dublin

Beaver
Buses of the United Kingdom
Minibuses